Laryssa Dias is a Brazilian actress and dancer. She started to become interested in artistic career at age five, when she began to study dance in the condominium where he lived. Passionate about film entered the theater at age 12. In 2008, made a cameo on the show 9mm: São Paulo FOX. In 2012, she joined the cast of the soap opera on Globo Salve Jorge playing the prostitute Waleska.

Biography
Laryssa Dias came to prominence on television in interpreting the trafficked Waleska in "Salve Jorge" novel written by Gloria Perez and aired from October 2012. At 13, she joined the Laryssa House Theatre, where space had lessons with actress Ligia Cortez and took lessons in dance and circus. Began College Advertising and Marketing, at the University Mackenzie in São Paulo, and in parallel, joined the School of Actors Wolf Maya, where she stayed for three years and graduated. The actress's first job in television was in the police series "9mm SP", the pay channel Fox, in the seasons of 2010 and 2011. In 2012, she also starred in the short film "I Buy Cigarettes," director Marcel Mallio.

Filmography

References

External links 

 

Living people
Actresses from São Paulo
Brazilian telenovela actresses
Brazilian female dancers
Year of birth missing (living people)